Bharat Kumar Shah is a Nepalese politician. He was elected to the Pratinidhi Sabha in the 1999 election on behalf of the Nepali Congress. Shah was the NC candidate in the Rupandehi-5 constituency for the 2008 Constituent Assembly election and was the Nepali Congress candidate in the Rupandehi-5 constituency for the new Constituent assembly election and won the election.

Personal life
Bharat Shah has a wife Anita Shah and two sons.

References

Living people
Nepali Congress politicians from Lumbini Province
People from Salyan District, Nepal
Nepal MPs 2017–2022
Nepal MPs 1999–2002
Members of the 2nd Nepalese Constituent Assembly
1954 births